Pseudoplagioporus is a genus of trematodes in the family Opecoelidae.

Species
Pseudoplagioporus interruptus Durio & Manter, 1968
Pseudoplagioporus lethrini Yamaguti, 1938
Pseudoplagioporus microrchis Yamaguti, 1942

References

Opecoelidae
Plagiorchiida genera